Vavasseur, a surname of French origin, once characterised a "vassal of a vassal", i.e., a sub-vassal - someone holding land not from the Crown directly but from a vassal of the Crown (cf. :fr:Vavasseur). Notable people with the surname include:

Didier Vavasseur (born 1961), French sprint canoer
François Vavasseur (1605–1681), French Jesuit humanist and controversialist
Henry Vavasseur, British entrepreneur who discovered how to make desiccated coconut in 1888
Josiah Vavasseur (1834–1908), English industrialist
Sophie Vavasseur (born 1992), Irish actress

See also
Vavasseur mounting, for artillery and machine guns
Vavasour (disambiguation)
Vavasour (surname)